Karen Khachanov defeated Novak Djokovic in the final, 7–5, 6–4 to win the singles tennis title at the 2018 Paris Masters. It was Khachanov's first Masters 1000 title, and he saved two match points en route, in his third round match against John Isner.

Jack Sock was the defending champion, but lost to Dominic Thiem in the quarterfinals. As a result, Sock fell out of the top 100 in the rankings after starting the season inside the top 10.

Rafael Nadal and Djokovic were in contention of the ATP no. 1 singles ranking. Djokovic regained the top spot after winning his opening match following Nadal's withdrawal from the event.

This tournament marked the first time since the 1998 Stuttgart Masters that no French or Spanish players reached the round of 16 of a Masters event.

Seeds
All seeds receive a bye into the second round.

Draw

Finals

Top half

Section 1

Section 2

Bottom half

Section 3

Section 4

Qualifying

Seeds

Qualifiers

Lucky losers

Qualifying draw

First qualifier

Second qualifier

Third qualifier

Fourth qualifier

Fifth qualifier

Sixth qualifier

References

External links
 Main draw
 Qualifying draw

Singles